Jenna McCorkell (born 15 September 1986) is a former figure skater from Northern Ireland. She is an eleven-time British national champion (2003–05; 2007–14) and won seven senior international medals, including gold at the Ondrej Nepela Memorial and Ice Challenge. She placed as high as eighth at the European Championships (2008) and 14th at the World Championships (2010, 2012), and competed at two Winter Olympics (2010, 2014).

Personal life
McCorkell was born on 15 September 1986 in Coleraine, County Londonderry, Northern Ireland. She married Belgian skater Kevin van der Perren in May 2008. The couple lives in Coleraine, Northern Ireland and have a son named Ben, born in 2019.

Career
McCorkell trained in Belfast, coached by Margaret McAllister and Yuri Bureiko, until the end of the 2001–02 season. In the 2002–03 season, she moved to Coventry where she was coached by Bureiko.

McCorkell competed three times, from 2002 to 2004, at the World Junior Championships, placing as high as 11th in 2003. She made her senior World and European Championships debut also in 2003.

Following the 2005–06 season, McCorkell moved to Liedekerke, Belgium where she was coached by Vera Vandecaveye.

McCorkell achieved her career-best European Championships result, 8th, in 2008. After the 2007–08 season, she rejoined Juri Bureiko and was also coached by Silvie De Rijcke. Her best Worlds finish, 14th, came in 2010 and 2012.

McCorkell changed coaches in April 2011. She decided to train with coach Simon Briggs in Ninove and Dundee. McCorkell had a torn abductor muscle at the end of 2012.

In February 2014, McCorkell competed at her second Winter Olympics. Ranked 25th in the short program, she did not advance to the free skate in Sochi, Russia. At the 2014 World Championships in Saitama, Japan, McCorkell qualified for the free skate but withdrew due to a hamstring injury.

Programs

Competitive highlights
GP: Grand Prix; JGP: Junior Grand Prix

2001–present

1996–2000

References

External links

 
 

British female single skaters
People from Coleraine, County Londonderry
Living people
1986 births
Olympic figure skaters of Great Britain
Figure skaters at the 2010 Winter Olympics
Figure skaters at the 2014 Winter Olympics
Figure skaters from Northern Ireland